A list of British films released in 1942.

1942

See also
 1942 in British music
 1942 in British television
 1942 in the United Kingdom

References

External links
 

1942
Films
British
1940s in British cinema